The 1984 United States Senate election in Texas was held on November 6, 1984. Incumbent Republican U.S. Senator John Tower decided to retire, instead of seeking a fifth term. Republican Phil Gramm won the open seat.

Democratic primary

Candidates
 Lloyd Doggett, State Senator from Austin since 1975
 Kent Hance, U.S. Representative from Lubbock since 1979
 Bob Krueger, former U.S. Representative from New Braunfels (1975–79) and nominee for Senate in 1978
 Harley Schlanger
 Robert Sullivan
 David Young

Campaign
The primary was 45% Hispanic, but included many moderate to conservative voters. Hance positioned himself as the most moderate to conservative candidate, who co-sponsored President Ronald Reagan's tax package. Doggett was the more liberal candidate, attacking Reaganomics and getting endorsements from the Texas teachers' union and Agriculture Commissioner Jim Hightower. Doggett's campaign manager was James Carville. Krueger was seen as the front runner and was a moderate who supported the state's oil and gas industry, but had close ties with the Hispanic community because he was Spanish-speaking. Hance attacked both Krueger and Doggett for supporting amnesty for illegal aliens and supporting gay rights.
The initial primary was extremely close between the top three candidates. Each candidate got 31% of the electorate. Hance ranked first, only 273 votes ahead of Doggett and 1,560 votes ahead of Krueger.

Since no candidate passed the 50% threshold, Hance and Doggett qualified for the run-off election. Hance fired his pollster despite ranking first. Krueger endorsed fellow U.S. Congressman Hance, saying "Ultimately, the quality of one's public service depends upon the character that one displays in filling an office." In the June election, Doggett very narrowly defeated Hance by just 1,345 votes.

Results
Initial election on May 5, 1984

Run-off election on June 2, 1984

Republican primary

Candidates
 Phil Gramm, U.S. Representative from College Station since 1979
 Hank Grover, State Senator and former State Representative from Houston
 Ron Paul, U.S. Representative from Lake Jackson (1976–77, 1979–85)
 Robert Mosbacher Jr., Houston oil businessman

Campaign
The primary was a highly competitive, multimillion-dollar contest. Gramm recently switched parties in 1983, but he was a conservative who supported Reaganomics. Gramm spent $4 million.

Results

General election

Candidates 
 Lloyd Doggett (D), State Senator
 Phil Gramm (R), U.S. Congressman

Results

See also 
  1984 United States Senate elections

References

Texas
1984
1984 Texas elections